Minoo Purshottam is an Indian playback singer who sang Bollywood songs, and was most popular during the 1960s and 1970s.

Career
Minoo Purshottam's career started in 1963 when she was 16. The composer Roshan offered her a singing role in the film Taj Mahal. The song eventually became a duet with Suman Kalyanpur.

Awards

Popular songs

Discography 

 Minoo purshottam ranj mein raahat (1980)
 Rehguzar Ghazals (1981)

References

Bollywood playback singers
Indian women playback singers
1944 births
Living people
Women musicians from Punjab, India
Singers from Punjab, India
20th-century Indian singers
20th-century Indian women singers
People from Patiala